The following is a list of presidents, notable alumni and faculty members of Miami University, in Oxford, Ohio, U.S.

Presidents of Miami University
 Robert Hamilton Bishop, 1824–1841
 George Junkin, 1841–1844
 Erasmus D. MacMaster, 1845–1849
 William Caldwell Anderson, 1849–1854
 Orange Nash Stoddard, 1854 (pro tempore)
 John W. Hall, 1854–1866
 Robert L. Stanton, 1866–1871
 Andrew Dousa Hepburn, 1871–1873 (pro tempore; later considered to be regular)
 Robert White McFarland, 1885–1888 (pro tempore; later considered to be regular)
 Ethelbert Dudley Warfield, 1888–1891
 William Oxley Thompson, 1891–1899
 David Stanton Tappan, 1899–1902
 Guy Potter Benton, 1902–1911
 Edgar Ewing Brandon, 1909–1910 (acting), 1927–1928 (acting)
 Raymond M. Hughes, 1911–1913 (acting), 1913–1927
 Alfred H. Upham, 1928–1945
 Alpheus K. Morris, 1945–1946 (acting)
 Ernest H. Hahne, 1946–1952
 Clarence W. Kreger, 1952–1953 (acting)
 John D. Millett, 1953–1964
 Charles Ray Wilson, 1964–1965 (acting)
 Phillip R. Shriver, 1965–1981
 Paul G. Pearson, 1981–1992
 Paul G. Risser, 1993–1995
 Anne Hopkins, December 1995 – July 1996 (acting)
 James C. Garland, 1996 – June 2006
 David C. Hodge, July 2006 – July 2016
 Greg Crawford, July 2016 – present

Alumni

Government and public administration

 Frederic W. Allen, Chief Justice of the Vermont Supreme Court (1984–1997)
 Charles Anderson, 27th Governor of Ohio (1865–1866)
 Calvin Stewart Brice, former U.S. Senator, railroad magnate and campaign manager for Grover Cleveland's U.S. presidential campaign against Brice's fellow Miami alumnus, Benjamin Harrison
 Burnie Bridge, Wisconsin Court of Appeals
 Susan Brooks, U.S. Congresswoman from Indiana's 5th Congressional District
 Richard S. Brown, Wisconsin Court of Appeals
 Michael Cabonargi, commissioner of the Cook County Board of Review
 James Edwin Campbell, 38th Governor of Ohio
 Maria Cantwell, current U.S. Senator from Washington
 Courtney Combs, member of Ohio House of Representatives
 William Dennison Jr., U.S. Postmaster General; 24th Governor of Ohio (1860–1862)
 Timothy Derickson, member of Ohio House of Representatives
 Mike DeWine, 70th Governor of Ohio, former U.S. Senator from Ohio
 Ozro J. Dodds, U.S. Representative from Ohio
 John E. Dolibois, ambassador to Luxembourg and interrogator at the Nuremberg Trials
 Denise Driehaus, member of Ohio House of Representatives
 Steve Driehaus, former U.S. Representative from the 1st district of Ohio
 Samuel Galloway, U.S. Representative from Ohio (1855–57)
 Herman Goldner, mayor of St. Petersburg, Florida, 1961–1967, 1971–1973
 Stan Greenberg, Democratic Party pollster and campaign strategist for Bill Clinton, Al Gore, and John Kerry
 Janet Greenip, Maryland State Senator
 Andrew L. Harris, 44th Governor of Ohio (1906–1909), U.S. Commissioner, American Civil War General 
 Benjamin Harrison, 23rd President of the United States (1889–1893) 
 David Archibald Harvey, U.S. Representative from Oklahoma 
 William Isaac, Chairman of the Federal Deposit Insurance Corporation (FDIC), 1981–1985
 Helen Jones-Kelley, former Director of the Ohio Department of Job and Family Services
 Isaac M. Jordan, U.S. Representative from Ohio
 Dave Karmol, member of Ohio House of Representatives
 Lauren Kelly, Deputy White House Social Secretary for Michelle Obama
 John F. Kibbey, Indiana Attorney General
 Brigham McCown, former U.S. Department of Transportation regulator during the George W. Bush administration
 John J. McRae, 21st Governor of Mississippi, Senator, U.S. Representative 
 Kenneth Merten, U.S. Ambassador to Croatia (2012–present) 
 Oliver P. Morton, former Indiana governor and U.S. Senator 
 Paul Muenzer, former Mayor of Naples, Florida (1992–1996)
 Michael Oxley, Member of Congress and co-sponsor of the Sarbanes-Oxley Act 
 John Weld Peck II, Judge of the United States Court of Appeals for the Sixth Circuit
 George Ellis Pugh, former U.S. Senator 
 Whitelaw Reid, U.S. Ambassador to France, 1889–1892, and U.S. Ambassador to the Court of St. James, 1905–1912; Republican candidate for Vice President on the ticket with fellow Miami alumnus, Benjamin Harrison, 1892 (the only time in American political history that the candidates for President and Vice President, put forward by a major political party, were undergraduates of the same college) 
 Steve Ricchetti, Chief of Staff to US Vice President Joe Biden; Former Deputy Chief of Staff to President Bill Clinton
 Paul Ryan, Speaker of the U.S. House of Representatives; 2012 GOP Vice Presidential candidate; U.S Congressman from Wisconsin's 1st district 
 Milton Sayler, U.S. Representative from Ohio 
 Michael Sekora, founder and director of the intelligence community's classified program, Project Socrates during the Reagan administration
 Yvette Simpson, current member and President Pro-Tempore of the Cincinnati City Council
 Caleb Blood Smith, sixth United States Secretary of the Interior, serving in the Cabinet of Abraham Lincoln 
 Sidney Souers, first Central Intelligence Agency Director appointed by President Harry S. Truman 
 Anthony Thornton, U.S. Representative from Illinois and Illinois Supreme Court Justice 
 Chung Un-chan, former Prime Minister of South Korea
 Andy Vollmer, former Acting General Counsel, United States Securities and Exchange Commission
 John B. Weller, fifth Governor of California, former Congressman from Ohio, U.S. Senator from California and Minister to Mexico
 Steve Wilson, current State Senator for Ohio's 7th Districts, former CEO of Lebanon Citizens National Bank.
 Shefali Razdan Duggal, current United States ambassador to the Netherlands
 Sara Carruthers, member of the Ohio House of Representatives
 Jennifer Brunner, current Justice of the Supreme Court of Ohio and first female Ohio Secretary of State

Military service

 Stan Arthur, U.S. Navy admiral
 Stuart P. Baker, U.S. Navy admiral
 Joseph R. Davis, C.S. Army general and commanding general of the Mississippi National Guard from 1888 to 1895
 Arthur F. Gorham, U.S. Army Distinguished Service Cross recipient
 Terrence C. Graves, U.S. Marine Corps Medal of Honor recipient
 James G. Jones, U.S. Air Force general
 Thomas E. Kuenning Jr., U.S. Air Force general
 Robert J. Meder, U.S. Army Air Forces pilot and participant in the Doolittle Raid
 Joseph Ralston, U.S. Air Force general and commander of the U.S. European Command/SHAPE from 2000 to 2003
 William W. Rogers, U.S. Marine Corps general
 Stephen Clegg Rowan, U.S. Navy admiral
 Durbin Ward, U.S. Army general
 Lester J. Whitlock, U.S. Army major general

Academia and science
 John Alexander Anderson, former Congressman from Kansas; consul to Egypt; second President of Kansas State University
 Carol Anderson, professor of African American Studies at Emory University
 C. Michael Armstrong, Chairman, Board of Trustees Johns Hopkins Medicine, Health System Corp. and Hospital, Baltimore, Maryland
 Joseph M. Bachelor, poet, professor
 Donald Barr, professor of Human Ecology at Cornell University and leader of movement to disinvest in South Africa
 David A. Caputo, president of Pace University
 Ronald Crutcher, President of University of Richmond; formerly, President of Wheaton College
 Katharine Jane Densford, Director of the University of Minnesota School of Nursing, provided important nursing leadership during World War II
 David Dickey, statistician
 Alston Ellis, president of Ohio University
 John Feldmeier, professor of Political Science at Wright State University and First Amendment attorney
 Grayson L. Kirk, former president of Columbia University
 Benjamin Lee, theoretical physicist
 Jeffrey Lieberman, president of American Psychiatric Association; chief of psychiatry at Columbia University
 Henry Mitchell MacCracken, former Chancellor of New York University
 Arman Manukyan, Professor of Bogazici University in Istanbul
 Mark B. Rosenberg, Chancellor of the State University System of Florida
 Donna Shalala, former U.S. Secretary of Health and Human Services for President Bill Clinton, current president of the University of Miami (Florida) and a graduate of the Western College for Women prior to its merger with Miami University
 Ernest H. Volwiler, former chairman, Abbott Labs and co-inventor, Pentothal
 Darrell M. West, Brown University professor, author, and Brookings Institution political scientist
 Joseph Pomeroy Widney, 2nd President of the University of Southern California, 1st dean of the USC School of Medicine, physician of scientific medical data; former Director of the United States Public Health Service; former Director of the New York Public Library; enlisted by philanthropist Andrew Carnegie to help develop a worldwide library system, resulting in the Carnegie libraries
 Richard K. Wilson, Director, The Genome Institute at Washington University in St. Louis

Arts and entertainment
 Kirk Baily, actor; Kevin 'Ug' Lee on Salute Your Shorts
 Fletcher Benton, sculptor and painter
 Leslie Greene Bowman, art curator and museum administrator
 Rebecca Budig, actress, All My Children
 Larry Clark, award-winning filmmaker associated with the "Los Angeles School of Black Filmmakers"
 Art Clokey, claymation artist and creator of Gumby and Pokey
 Joseph W. Clokey, organist, composer
 Ray Combs, Family Feud game show host (did not graduate)
 Kathryn Craft, author of literary fiction and contemporary women's fiction
 Chase Crawford, actor and producer (did not graduate)
 Charles Michael Davis, actor and director
 Rita Dove, Pulitzer Prize winner; first African-American U.S. Poet Laureate; Consultant to the Library of Congress; 2012 recipient, Presidential National Medal of Arts Award
 Theresa Flaminio, musician
 Mark Hentemann, executive producer of Family Guy
 Griffin House, singer/songwriter
 Rajiv Joseph, dramatist and Pulitzer Prize finalist
 Austin Kleon, artist
 Nick Lachey, pop musician; 98 Degrees (did not graduate)
 Eric Lange, American television and movie actor
 The Lemon Pipers, 1960s psychedelic band
 Tina Louise, actress; Ginger on Gilligan's Island
 Kristen Erwin Schlotman, film producer
 Rick Ludwin, NBC television executive
 Mark Mitten, Academy-Award nominated and Emmy-winning documentary producer, Abacus: Small Enough to Jail
 Brad Moore, co-founder and drummer with Busker Busker
 Mojo Nixon, musician
 Steven Reineke, conductor of The New York Pops
 Jackson Rohm, pop/country musician
 Kate Voegele, singer, songwriter, guitarist, and pianist; also known for a prominent role in CW TV series One Tree Hill (did not graduate)
 Jack Warshaw, folk singer, songwriter, musician
John M. Watson, Sr., trombonist with Red Saunders and Count Basie Orchestras; educator; actor in 13 movies (The Fugitive, Soul Food) and several theater roles including the Broadway production of One Flew Over the Cuckoo's Nest
 Roger Welch, artist
 Joseph Pomeroy Widney, prolific author
 Matthew Yuricich, Academy Award winner, special effects
 Beth Stelling, Comedian

Journalism and media

 Dwight M. "Mitch" Barns, CEO, Nielsen Holdings
 Ira Berkow, sports writer, The New York Times
 Eric Ehrmann, columnist, sports and global affairs, Huffington Post, LePost-LeMonde, pioneer contributor to Rolling Stone in 1968, member of PEN (dropped out 1968)
 Mike Emrick, NHL play-by-play for New Jersey Devils, NBC, Versus; London and Rio Olympics announcer for NBC
 Wil Haygood, Washington Post writer; author of A Butler Well Served by This Election, inspiration for the movie The Butler, Two on the River, King of Cats: The Life and Times of Adam Clayton Powell Jr., and The Haygoods of Columbus: A Love Story
 Bill Hemmer, Fox News Channel anchor
 Dave Hyde, sports columnist, Sun Sentinel
 Katie Lee, television personality, food critic, and ex-wife of pop music superstar Billy Joel
 Alexander C. McClurg, senior partner of A. C. McClurg and Union Army general
 Dorothy Misener Jurney, the "godmother of women's pages". (Western College)
 Terence Moore, sports journalist, CNN.com, AOL FanHouse, sports on Earth.com, ESPN Outside the Lines, MSNBC
 P. J. O'Rourke, conservative satirist
Mariel Padilla, journalist, Pulitzer Prize winner
 Jeff Pegues, CBS News correspondent; former Miami football player (wide receiver)
 Whitelaw Reid, editor-in-chief, New York Tribune; US vice presidential candidate with President Benjamin Harrison (the only time in US history that presidential and vice presidential candidates were alumni of the same university)
 Chris Rose, sportscaster
 Bill Sammon, Senior White House Correspondent, Washington Examiner, formerly at the Washington Times; and political analyst for Fox News Channel, and the author of four New York Times bestsellers
 David Teeuwen (1970–2015), managing editor of USA Today, where he helped pioneer digital news
 Darrell M. West, Brown University professor, author, and Brookings Institution political scientist
 Gerri Willis, television news journalist; host of The Willis Report on Fox Business Network; formerly with CNN hosting Your Bottom Line and as the senior financial correspondent of SmartMoney

Theology

 Joseph R. Binzer, auxiliary bishop of the Archdiocese of Cincinnati from 2011 to 2020.
 David Swing, 19th-century preacher and liberal theologian; confidant of Abraham Lincoln and Mary Todd Lincoln
 William McClure Thomson, 19th-century missionary based in Lebanon
 Walter Wangerin, Jr., theologian and award-winning author
 Joseph Pomeroy Widney, co-founder of the Church of the Nazarene and the Church of the All-Father

Business

 C. Michael Armstrong former CEO of AT&T, Hughes Electronics and Comcast Corporation; former Chairman of the IBM World Trade Corporation
 Arthur D. Collins, Jr., Chairman (retired), Medtronic, Inc.
 Emily E. Douglas, CEO and founder of Grandma's Gifts Inc.
 Bruce Downey, CEO of Barr Pharmaceuticals
 Richard T. Farmer, founder and Chairman of Cintas Corporation
 Tom Fox, CEO of Aston Villa football club, England
 Lynn Good, Chairman, President and CEO of Duke Energy
 Ryan Graves, Head of Global Operations, Uber
 Gregory D. Hague, entrepreneur, lawyer, author
 Mark Hoyt, CFO of Groupon and OneSpan and Loadsmart
 Sheraton Kalouria, Chief Marketing Officer and Executive Vice President at Sony Pictures Television
 Samuel Laws, inventor of the stock ticker on the New York Gold Exchange
 Marne Levine, COO of Instagram
 Kim Lubel, Chairman and CEO of CST Brands
 Richard McVey, Founder, Chairman and CEO of MarketAxess
 Dwight Merriman, Internet executive and entrepreneur; co-founder of DoubleClick, current subsidiary of Google
 Dinesh Paliwal, Chairman, CEO and President of Harman International
 John H. Patterson, founder of NCR (National Cash Register)
 Marvin Pierce, former President of McCall Corporation, father of former First Lady Barbara Bush, and maternal grandfather of US President George W. Bush
 Mitchell Rales, co-founder, CEO, and current Chairman of the Executive Committee and Director of Danaher Corporation
 Jack Rogers, Chairman of the Board and CEO of United Parcel Service (retired)
 Jeff Schwartz, Founder and President of Excel Sports Management
 John G. Smale, CEO at Procter & Gamble; chairman of General Motors
 Sheldon White, Vice President of Pro Personnel, Detroit Lions, Inc.
Brian Niccol, CEO of Chipotle Mexican Grill
 Richard K. Smucker, Executive Chairman and Co-Chief Executive Officer of the J.M. Smucker Company

Athletics

 Dave Abelson (born 1975), Canadian tennis player.
 Brad Adamonis, professional golfer who currently plays on the PGA Tour 
 Kevyn Adams, former NHL player, Chicago Blackhawks; member of 2006 Stanley Cup champion Carolina Hurricanes 
 Walter Alston (1935), former manager of the Brooklyn and Los Angeles Dodgers baseball teams; earned four World Series championships and seven National League pennants 
 Jerry Angelo, General Manager of the Chicago Bears
 JoJuan Armour, former NFL and CFL player
 Bill Arnsparger (1949), NFL coach, Baltimore Colts and Miami Dolphins, San Diego Chargers; NCAA football coach; Head Coach, LSU; Athletic Director, University of Florida 
 Randy Ayers (1978), former NBA player and college Head Coach at Ohio State University and Head Coach of the NBA's Philadelphia 76ers, Assistant Coach of the Orlando Magic and current Assistant Coach of NBA Washington Wizards 
 Bob Babich (1969), former NFL player, San Diego Chargers and Cleveland Browns; First-Team All-American in football
 Riley Barber, player, NHL, Washington Capitals 
 Jack Baruth, pro BMX rider and Alt Fuel class winner of the 2006 Cannonball Run
 Jacob Bell, NFL, St. Louis Rams
Chris Bergeron, Head Men's hockey coach, former Head Coach at Bowling Green and former professional hockey center
 Ira Berkow, sports writer, The New York Times 
 Eric Beverly, NFL player, Detroit Lions and Atlanta Falcons 
 Earl "Red" Blaik (1918), former Head Coach, Army football; member of the NFL Foundation Hall of Fame 
 Enrico Blasi, former Head Men's Hockey Coach, Miami University; two-time recipient of national coach of the year award
 Dan Boyle (1998), NHL player for the New York Rangers and San Jose Sharks; won Stanley Cup and 2010 gold medal with Canadian Olympic Team 
 Michael Bramos, professional basketball player; joined the Spanish ACB League club Gran Canaria in 2010 
 Brandon Brooks, NFL player, Philadelphia Eagles and Houston Texans 
 Paul Brown (1930), partial founder of the Cleveland Browns and the Cincinnati Bengals and the first head coach for both teams 
 Brendan Burke, inspiration for You Can Play organization
 Carter Camper, NHL player, New Jersey Devils; formerly, Boston Bruins 
 Patrick Cannone, NHL player, Minnesota Wild 
 Rob Carpenter (1977), NFL player, where he rushed for 4,363 yards in a 10-year career with the Houston Oilers, New York Giants and Los Angeles Rams 
 Alain Chevrier (1984), NHL player, New Jersey Devils 
 Blake Coleman, NHL player, New Jersey Devils
 Mark Coleman (1985–1987), NCAA All-American wrestler placing 4th in 1986 (190lbs), retired professional Mixed Martial Artist, former UFC Light Heavyweight Champion and UFC Hall of Fame member
 Carmen Cozza (1952), former head football coach, Yale University; played in NFL for Green Bay Packers and in Cleveland Indians and Chicago White Sox organization 
 Tom Crabtree, NFL tight end, Green Bay Packers 
 Austin Czarnik, NHL player, Boston Bruins, Calgary Flames
 Paul Dietzel (1948), All-American center, football; Head Coach, football at LSU, South Carolina and Army; National Coach of the Year 
 Bill Doran, former second baseman for the Houston Astros, Cincinnati Reds, and Milwaukee Brewers; bench coach, Kansas City Royals 
 Jacques Dussault, World League of American Football Head coach at Montreal Machine. CFL Assistant coach at Montreal Alouettes and Montreal Concordes. Albany Great Danes Defensive Coordinator
 Adam Eaton, current center fielder for the Washington Nationals; formerly with Chicago White Sox and Arizona Diamondbacks
 John Ely, Major League Baseball pitcher, Los Angeles Dodgers 
 Wayne Embry (1958), Senior Advisor and former General Manager, NBA Toronto Raptors; former NBA player and NBA executive with the Milwaukee Bucks and Cleveland Cavaliers, and was the first African American NBA General Manager and Team President; two-time basketball All-American at Miami
 Mike Emrick, NHL play-by-play for New Jersey Devils, NBC, Versus; London and Rio Olympics announcer for NBC
 Weeb Ewbank (1928), Super Bowl-winning NFL Head Coach; won two NFL titles with the Baltimore Colts and the New York Jets 
 Steve Fireovid, former Major League Baseball Pitcher and author of "The 26th Man: One Minor League Pitcher's Pursuit of a Dream."
 Fred Foster, former player, NBA Portland Trail Blazers
 Trevor Gaylor, player, NFL, Kansas City Chiefs
 Mike Glumac, NHL player, St. Louis Blues 
 Andy Greene, NHL player, New Jersey Devils
 Marc Hagel, player, NHL, Minnesota Wild 
 Bud Haidet (1957), Athletic Director, University of Wisconsin–Milwaukee; instrumental in their move from NAIA to NCAA Division I membership in 1990
 Danny Hall (1977), head baseball coach, Georgia Tech
 John Harbaugh (1984), head coach, Baltimore Ravens
 Ron Harper, retired NBA player, five-time NBA Champion, Chicago Bulls and Los Angeles Lakers; coach, Detroit Pistons and Orlando Magic
 Wil Haygood, Washington Post writer; author of A Butler Well Served by This Election, inspiration for the movie The Butler, Two on the River, King of Cats: The Life and Times of Adam Clayton Powell Jr., and The Haygoods of Columbus: A Love Story 
 Darrell Hedric (1955), winningest basketball coach in Miami history
 Bob Hitchens (1974), player, NFL, New England Patriots, Kansas City Chiefs and Pittsburgh Steelers 
 Alphonso Hodge, NFL player, cornerback, Kansas City Chiefs 
 Ron Hunter, Head Men's Basketball Coach, Georgia State University; formerly Head Men's Basketball Coach, IUPUI 
 Bob Jencks (1963), NFL player, Washington Redskins and Chicago Bears; Super Bowl Champions with Chicago Bears 
 Ryan Jones, NHL player, Edmonton Oilers; Nashville  Predators 
 Ernie Kellermann (1965), former defensive back for the Cleveland Browns, Cincinnati Bengals and Buffalo Bills 
 Aaron Kromer, NFL, New Orleans Saints 2012 Interim Head Coach; Offensive Line and Running Game Coach
 Sean Kuraly NHL player, Boston Bruins 
 Charlie Leibrandt (1978), former pitcher for the Cincinnati Reds, Kansas City Royals, Atlanta Braves, and Texas Rangers; 140-119 Major League record 
 Bill Long, former pitcher in Major League Baseball, played for the Chicago White Sox, Chicago Cubs and Montreal Expos
 Vincent LoVerde, player, NHL Los Angeles Kings organization
 Phil Lumpkin (1981), player, NBA Portland Trailblazer and Phoenix Suns, later became a successful high school basketball coach in Washington State 
 Bill Mallory (1957), head football coach, Miami University, University of Colorado at Boulder, Indiana University Bloomington; Big Ten Coach of the Year 
 Alec Martinez, NHL player, Los Angeles Kings 
 Julian Mavunga, professional basketball player, currently with Kyoto Hannaryz of Japanese First Division
 Curtis McKenzie, player, NHL, Dallas Stars
 Ryan McNeil, former NFL player
 John McVay (1953), former Head Coach, New York Giants; General Manager, San Francisco 49ers (5 Super Bowl Championships; NFL Executive of the Year winner) 
 Sean McVay, Head Coach, Los Angeles Rams (youngest Head Coach in NFL history); Tight Ends Coach, Washington Redskins 
 Justin Mercier, NHL player, Colorado Avalanche organization 
 Andy Miele, 2011 Hobey Baker Award recipient; NHL player, Philadelphia Flyers, Phoenix Coyotes 
 Marvin Miller, union leader Major League Baseball Players Association (attended Miami University before transferring to and graduating from NYU)
 Mike Mizanin, aka The Miz, WWE wrestler/entertainer
 Bill Mulliken (1961), 1960 Olympic gold medalist, swimming 
 Tim Naehring, former MLB player, Boston Red Sox
 Ty Neal (1999), college baseball coach at Cincinnati
 Ira Newble, NBA player, Cleveland Cavaliers, Seattle SuperSonics and Los Angeles Lakers
 Jake O'Connell, tight end, NFL, Kansas City Chiefs
 Henry Orth, football player
 Ara Parseghian (1949), former head football coach of the Notre Dame Fighting Irish 
 Jeff Pegues, CBS news correspondent 
 Brian Pillman, professional wrestler
 John Pont (1952), head football coach, Miami University, Yale University, Indiana University, Northwestern University; national Coach of the Year; led Indiana to Big Ten title and Rose Bowl 
 Travis Prentice, retired NFL player, NCAA Division I-A Career leader in points scored, Cleveland Browns, Minnesota Vikings 
 Ryne Robinson, NFL player, Carolina Panthers 
 Randy Robitaille, NHL player, Ottawa Senators 
 Ben Roethlisberger (2012), NFL player, two time Super Bowl winning quarterback for the Pittsburgh Steelers 
 Quinten Rollins, NFL player, Green Bay Packers
Jack Roslovic, NHL player, Winnipeg Jets organization; member of 2017 Gold Medal United States World Juniors team
 Scott Sauerbeck, Major League Baseball pitcher, Cincinnati Reds 
 Brian Savage, NHL player, Philadelphia Flyers 
 Ollie Savatsky, NFL player, Cleveland Rams
 Bo Schembechler (1951), former football head coach of the University of Michigan, Ann Arbor Wolverines 
 Cameron Schilling, NHL player, Chicago Blackhawks; and Washington Capitals organization 
 Bob Schul (1966), 1964 Olympic Gold medalist, 5000m run 
Rob Senderoff, college basketball coach
 Sam Sloman (born 1997), NFL football player
 Reilly Smith, NHL player, Florida Panthers, formerly Boston Bruins and Dallas Stars 
 Sherman Smith (1976), NFL player, Seattle Seahawks, Running Backs Coach, Seattle Seahawks, coach Tennessee Titans, Offensive Coordinator Washington Redskins 
 Gary Steffes, professional hockey player, AHL, varied teams; member of Team USA at the 2005 IIHF World U18 Championships held in the Czech Republic
 Milt Stegall, CFL player, Winnipeg Blue Bombers, CFL all-time leader in receiving yards and touchdowns; NFL player, Cincinnati Bengals 
 Steve Strome (1964), Head Tennis Coach, LSU
 Alex Sulfsted, player, NFL, Kansas City Chiefs 
 Wally Szczerbiak (1999), NBA player, Cleveland Cavaliers, Boston Celtics and Minnesota Timberwolves; current CBS Sports Announcer 
 Justin Vaive, player, NHL New York Islanders organization 
 Trent Vogelhuber, player, NHL Colorado Avalanche, Columbus Blue Jackets organization
 Jerry Walker (1971), team archivist San Francisco 49ers; Director of Public Relations San Francisco 49ers; Sports Information Director Lorain County Community College, University of New Orleans and San Jose State; Assistant SID LSU 
 Randy Walker (1976), former head football coach at Miami and Northwestern University
 Sheldon White, Vice President of Pro Personnel, Detroit Lions, Inc.; former NFL player with New York Giants, Detroit Lions and Cincinnati Bengals 
 Chris Wideman, NHL player, Ottawa Senators 
 Hayley Williams, Russian Women's Hockey League player 
 Kevin Wilson, offensive coordinator, Ohio State University football team; former Head Coach, Indiana University football team
 Tommy Wingels, NHL player, San Jose Sharks 
 Nobby Wirkowski (1951), professional football player and coach
 Jeff Zatkoff, NHL goaltender, Los Angeles Kings, Pittsburgh Penguins; member of 2016 Stanley Cup champion Pittsburgh Penguins
 Ron Zook, former head football coach at the University of Illinois and University of Florida

Notable faculty
 José Antonio Bowen, President of Goucher College
 Louise Holland, academic, philologist and archaeologist
 William Holmes McGuffey
 Raymond Burke instructor, businessman, founder of the Miami University Men's Glee Club and member of the United States House of Representatives from Ohio's third district
 Karen Dawisha, political scientist, author of Putin's Kleptocracy
 Walter Havighurst, English professor and namesake of the Havighurst Center for Russian and Post-Soviet Studies
 Daisy Hernández, writer and editor

See also
 Cradle of Coaches

References

External links

"The Royal Tenenbaums and 19 More of Our Favorite Pop-Cultural Legos. , Paste Magazine.

 
Miami University people